The House of Al Falahi is a tribal clan that belongs to Bani Yas tribal confederation. The ruling family of Al Nahyan of the Emirate of Abu Dhabi comes from this house and tribe. It is blood related to the House of Al Falasi that Al Maktoum, the ruling family of the Emirate of Dubai is a branch of.

See also 
 Royal families of the United Arab Emirates

References

Al-Falahi
Middle Eastern royal families